The Quantou Formation is a Cretaceous Period (Mesozoic Era) geologic formation in China. It is primarily Albian in age. It has been explored for its potential as a tight oil reservoir.

Dinosaur remains are among the fossils that have been recovered from the formation.

Vertebrate paleofauna
Changchunsaurus
Helioceratops
Jiutaisaurus

See also 
 List of dinosaur-bearing rock formations

Footnotes

Bibliography 
 Weishampel, David B.; Dodson, Peter; and Osmólska, Halszka (eds.): The Dinosauria, 2nd, Berkeley: University of California Press. 861 pp. .

Geologic formations of China
Cretaceous System of Asia
Cretaceous China
Albian Stage
Aptian Stage
Cenomanian Stage